The Punch and Judy Murders (also published under the title The Magic Lantern Murders) is a mystery novel by the American writer John Dickson Carr (1906–1977), who published it under the name of Carter Dickson.  It is a whodunnit and features the series detective Sir Henry Merrivale.

Plot summary
Kenwood Blake, introduced in the previous Sir Henry Merrivale mystery The Unicorn Murders, is about to marry a former British Secret Service operative, Evelyn Cheyne, when he is sidetracked by an urgent telegram from Sir Henry asking him to come to Torquay to play an undercover role under an alias he had used in World War 1, "Robert Butler".

Paul Hogenauer, a German polymath with many skills and interests, has aroused the suspicion of Sir Henry and Colonel Charters, the Chief Constable of the county by his recent interest in ghosts and spiritualism.  Sir Henry and Colonel Charters feel that anti-British espionage may underlie recent events, and they suspect the involvement of a German spy known only as L.

A police officer observing Hogenauer's house reports "the room was dark, but that it seemed to be very full of small, moving darts of light flickering round a thing like a flower-pot turned upside down."  Blake, as Butler, drives Sir Henry's car to Hogenauer's house and is promptly arrested—to his great surprise, Sir Henry and Colonel Charters disavow any knowledge of his actions.

Blake/Butler escapes, breaks into Hogenauer's house and finds Hogenauer, dead in his easy chair, grinning from the rictus of strychnine and wearing a Turkish fez.  A colleague of Hogenauer, Dr. Keppel, is soon found to be dead in a hotel halfway across town, apparently killed simultaneously with Hogenauer.  Blake/Butler and his fiancée must stay a step ahead of the police and race around investigating espionage, counterfeiting, spiritualism, and multiple impersonations.  Finally Sir Henry examines and discards three complex possible solutions, revealing the murderer just in time for the wedding.

1936 American novels
Novels by John Dickson Carr
Novels set in Devon
Heinemann (publisher) books